Gymnophthalmus cryptus,  the cryptic spectacled tegu, is a species of lizard in the family Gymnophthalmidae. It is endemic to Venezuela.

References

Gymnophthalmus
Reptiles of Venezuela
Endemic fauna of Venezuela
Reptiles described in 1992
Taxa named by Marinus Steven Hoogmoed
Taxa named by Charles J. Cole
Taxa named by José Ayarzagüena